Lionheart is a name applied to the main motor yacht owned by British businessman Sir Philip Green.

2016 - Lionheart

The current  yacht is the third commissioned by Green to be built by Benetti Yachts (project FB262). With contracts signed in 2012, it is built of steel with an aluminium superstructure.

2006 - Lioness V
Built in 2006 by Benetti, the  former "Lionheart" is now named Lioness V. Custom designed and engineered by Stefano Natucci (its length below  allows it to be permanently docked in Monaco harbour, where the Greens reside), its interior was designed by Argent Design. With a steel hull and an aluminium superstructure, the yacht had a contract price of £32M ($50Mmillion). The yacht can sleep up to 12 guests in 6 rooms, including: a master suite; 3 double cabins; 2 twin cabins; and accommodation for up to 19 crew. The yacht has a fast Otam Cigarette  tender named Lion Cub. Still owned by Tina Green's company Taveta Investments, Lioness V is available for charter.

1999 - Lumiere
Built in 1999 by Benetti, the  former Lionheart is now named Lumiere. Custom designed and engineered by Stefano Natucci, its interior was designed by Argent Design. The yacht can sleep up to 12 guests in 6 rooms, including a master suite, 1 VIP stateroom, 2 double cabins, 2 twin cabins and 2 convertible cabins; and is capable of carrying up to 11 crew. Named Cuor di Leone after being replaced by Green in 2006, he sold it and it is now named Lumiere and available for charter.

Lionchase
Docked in Monaco, it acts as a fast-tender to Lionheart.

References

Yachts